Hanging Horn Lake is a lake in Carlton County, Minnesota, in the United States.

"Hanging Horn" is probably an English translation of the Ojibwe-language name.

See also
List of lakes in Minnesota

References

Lakes of Minnesota
Lakes of Carlton County, Minnesota